Valeri Saar (born 28 June 1955 in Valga) is an Estonian military personnel (Major General).

In 1976, he graduated from the Higher Air Defense Radio Electronic Military College in Zhitomir, Ukraine.

He started his military career in 1976, being an engineer and the Chief of Radar Station in the Air Defense unit. Between the years of 2007 to 2012, he was the Commander of Estonian Air Force. Since 2012, he has been the Military Representative of Estonia to NATO and EU Military Committees.

In 2005, he was awarded with Order of the Cross of the Eagle, III class.

References

1955 births
Living people
People from Valga, Estonia
Estonian major generals
Soviet Air Defence Force officers
20th-century Estonian military personnel
21st-century Estonian military personnel
Recipients of the Military Order of the Cross of the Eagle, Class III